Arruitz is a town and a local council area in the municipality of Larraun within the Autonomous Community of Navarra, northern Spain.

Navarre